York is the oldest inland town in Western Australia, situated on the Avon River,  east of Perth in the Wheatbelt, on Ballardong Nyoongar land, and is the seat of the Shire of York.

The name of the region was suggested by JS Clarkson during an expedition in October 1830 because of its similarity to his own county in England, Yorkshire.

After thousands of years of occupation by Ballardong Nyoongar people, the area was first settled by Europeans in 1831, two years after Perth was settled in 1829. A town was established in 1835 with the release of town allotments and the first buildings were erected in 1836.

The region was important throughout the 19th century for sheep and grain farming, sandalwood, cattle, goats, pigs and horse breeding.

York boomed during the gold rush as it was one of the last rail stops before the walk to the goldfields.

Today, the town attracts tourists for its beauty, history, buildings, festivals and art.

Ballardong Nyoongar
The Ballardong people, a sub-group of the Nyoongar, occupied the land before European settlement.

Post-settlement history
With the increasing population of the Swan River Settlement in 1830, it became evident that suitable land would have to be discovered for the growing of crops needed to provide necessary food.

Ensign Robert Dale, a 20-year-old officer of the 63rd Regiment, led a small party in the first exploratory journey over the Darling Range, during the winter months of 1830 into what was later to be known as the Avon Valley.

He returned with a report of "park-like lands with scattered trees", and after a second expedition, Lieutenant-Governor Stirling concluded that there appeared to be 1,000 square miles of "the finest imaginable sheep-land".

As a result, Stirling decided that the new district should be thrown open for selection and this was done by Government Notice on 11 November 1830. By December 1830, 250,000 acres had been allotted, and in January 1831, 80,000 acres. Before the end of 1831 a further 6,030 acres in small lots had been taken up.

In September 1831 Dale escorted the first party of settlers to the district, reaching the Avon valley on 16 September. They immediately set about the construction of huts, the preparation required for their stock and the cultivation of new land. Dale proposed an area two miles south of the summit of Mt Bakewell as the site for a future town to serve the district.

In September 1833 a garrison of eight troops of the 21st North British Fusiliers was stationed at York. Rules and regulations for the assignment of town allotments at York were gazetted in September 1834 and allotments were advertised for sale from July 1835.

A township did not begin to appear until 1836. In July 1836 York comprised two houses, a barn, an army barracks and some out-houses, with about 50 acres of cleared land. The town grew slowly at first due to difficulties with the local aboriginals, as well as problems associated with using English farming techniques in an unfamiliar climate.

In 1831, Revett Henry Bland settled in York, and with his business partner, Arthur Trimmer, leased a 10-acre site north of the town (on which they had built the first house, by the end of September 1831) and took a grant over a 4,000 acre block to the south which they established as a farm, later called Balladong Farm, after the Ballardong Noongar, the Aboriginal occupiers of the area.  Later, part of the land to the south came to be called Bland's Town or Bland Town. Bland was resident magistrate from 1834 to 1842.

In 1836, John Henry Monger Snr arrived and bought the 10 acres of land immediately north of the town site from Bland and Trimmer for £100 on which the first house in York had been constructed of wattle and daub.  Monger opened a hotel by early 1837, constructing in 1842 a "long, low building" opposite the hotel for a store, and "every three months his wagons would journey to Guildford or Perth for supplies".

In July 1836 Lieutenant Henry William St Pierre Bunbury of the 21st Regiment was sent to York to respond to rising levels of violence between colonial settlers and Ballardong Noongar people. His mission was "to make war upon the native". After many individual skirmishes and killings of Ballardong people, rumours of an attack on the natives, in which "several ... were wounded, and one woman was killed", were reported. In response to this, Ballardong people speared a shepherd called Knott. Bunbury initially tried to cover up Knott's death to avoid further conflict.

In July 1837 Bunbury was again sent to the York district after the spearing deaths of two young settlers called Chidlow and Jones. In the ensuing violence soldiers and settlers killed at least 18 Ballardong Noongar people.

In 1840, the York Agricultural Society was established, which became very influential in the following years, holding annual shows to the present day.  The York Racing Club was established in 1843.  Both societies continue today.

A shortage of labour was a problem for the farming community, particularly at harvest time.  A sandalwood boom in the late 1840s lifted the town.

At the request of the influential York Agricultural Society, from 1851, convicts were transported to the Colony and relieved the labour shortages.  As "ticket-of-leave" men, they constructed many of the early buildings.

Solomon Cook constructed a flourmill in 1851 and then steam engine in 1852 to power his mill.

York was connected by rail in 1885.  Following the discovery of gold in the Yilgarn in 1887, the town was teeming with miners, all alighting from the train and preparing to make the long journey across the plains to the goldfields.

In the 1880s the question as to whether or not the railway line to the Goldfields should be run through York or Northam was the subject of bitter debate. "Tradition is that State Parliamentarians became so tired of hearing the rival Notham/York arguments that they suggested that representatives of the two towns decide the issue by a game of cards." In December 1891, the State Government decided that the line should run through Northam because the distance to Yilgarn was 15 miles shorter and £500 cheaper.

The 1968 Meckering earthquake damaged a number of buildings and resulted in removal of the Royal Hotel.

Between 1968 and 1971, due to the general downturn in rural activities, and a progressive reduction in railway operations in favour of Northam, many York businesses closed and the population reduced to some extent.

Attractions

York is located in the valley between Mt Bakewell and Mt Brown, known to the Ballardong Noongar as Walwalling and Wongborel.  On the road to York in Spring are canola fields which draw many tourists.

In addition to its heritage and Arts and Crafts buildings and other architecture (refer below), the town features the York Motor Museum, the Courthouse complex, galleries, bric-à-brac and book shops, skydiving and paragliding, and walks along the picturesque Avon River and up Mt Brown.

The main attractions in the town include:

Avon Terrace, the main street, lined with heritage buildings
The York Motor Museum, holding 60 vintage cars and 16 motor cycles and other vehicles as well as motor memorabilia
The York Town Hall
The Courthouse complex, which is now a commercial gallery, and the 1852 cells
The giant straw (wara art) sculptures of endangered animals
The Residency Museum
The Suspension Bridge (also called the Swing Bridge)
Faversham House
Blandstown, a very rare hamlet with many mid to late 19th century homes, unspoilt by development
Historic churches, particularly St Patrick's Church, Holy Trinity Church, and the Uniting Church, and their adjoining church halls.

Shops of interest to visitors include:

Gallery 152, a curated gallery
Botanicalia, gallery shop and café, in the former Dinsdale's Shoe Emporium
Barclay Books
The York Flour Mill café and shops
The Sock Factory
Penny Farthing Sweets
Jules cafe

The main attractions outside the town include:

York Olive Oil
White Gum Farm
Australia's oldest racecourse

In addition to the historic Faversham House, the York Post Office apartment, Hope Farm, and the Old York School and Farm House, there are many other charming places to stay.  The town has four historic hotels: Settlers House, the York Palace Hotel, the Imperial Hotel and the Castle Hotel.  Lavendale Farm offers farm stays.

The town is popular with walkers, cyclists, and photographers. Faversham House, Laurelville, the Imperial Hotel, the York Racecourse, and the Olive Branch provide a venue for weddings and small conferences or other corporate events, as does Lavendale Farm.

York offers a splendid wildflower garden behind Faversham House, as well as Avon Park, next to the town on the river, and Peace Park.

The York Agricultural Show and The York Festival are normally held in September and October each year.

Heritage buildings

With its hamlet Bland's Town, York has buildings from each decade from the early settlers (1830s and 1840s), the convict period (1850s and 1860s), the coming of rail (1885), the Gold Rush (1887 to 1900), and the Federation boom, culminating in the York Town Hall (1911).

Faversham House, overlooking the north end of Avon Terrace, is one of the grandest surviving Colonial homes in the State.

More than 200 buildings or sites in York are heritage listed, most within the town itself. Many of York's older homes and buildings have now been restored and, while some have retained their original use (e.g. the York Post Office), others have been adaptively re-used with success, such as the former York Primary School (1886).

Arts and Crafts buildings and other fine architecture
The Principal Architect, George Temple-Poole, was a follower of Arts and Crafts Style which came out of the Arts and Crafts Movement inspired by William Morris and John Ruskin. The railway station building (built in 1885), is one of the earliest Federation Arts and Crafts buildings in Australia and could be a Cotswold cottage from Bibury in Gloucestershire, that William Morris considered the ideal in house design. The Old York Hospital has similarity to William Morris's own home, Red House and is one of the most admired Arts and Crafts buildings in the State. The former York Primary School (1886) also repeats a motif from Red House (the flèche).

Federation Free Style buildings (the commercial equivalent of Arts and Crafts style) include the York Post Office (1893), the Courthouse and police station (c. 1896). All are designed by Temple-Poole and are on the State Heritage Register.

The centre of the town has fine examples of a dozen other Victorian and Federation architectural styles, virtually uninterrupted by modern buildings. The Victorian Georgian style buildings include the old sections of Settlers House and the Castle Hotel.

The Convent School House (1872) is a Victorian Tudor building, the same style as many of Perth's early buildings and also probably designed by Richard Roach Jewell.

York churches include the Victorian Romanesque style Anglican Holy Trinity Church (completed in 1854), designed by Richard Roach Jewell; St Patrick's original church (1859–60); St Patrick's Church (designed in the Gothic Revival style by the former convict architect Joseph Nunan and completed in 1886); and the Uniting Church Chapel constructed in Victorian Georgian style (1854) and the Uniting Church in Victorian Academic Gothic style (1888).

The Catholic Presbytery is in Victorian Rustic Gothic style.

The coming of rail in 1885 brought the Victorian Filigree style Imperial Hotel (1886).

Gold rush buildings include the Federation Warehouse style York Flour Mill (1892), now a café and gallery, at the entrance to York and many of the buildings in Avon Terrace.

The Western Australian Bank building, designed by JJ Talbot Hobbs and the Masonic Hall (designed by James William Wright), are in Victorian Academic Classical style.

Most of the main street, Avon Terrace, has Victorian or Federation Free Classical buildings, including the Co-op (IGA) (1888 façade), the York Motor Museum, and Dinsdale's Shoe Emporium (1887) designed by Wright, with a cluster of Federation Romanesque buildings at the north end, including the former Fire Station (1897).

Early 20th century buildings include the stunning Federation Mannerist (or Edwardian Opulence) style Town Hall (also designed by Wright, and built in 1911), and an exemplar of Federation Filigree style, the Castle Hotel (1905), designed by William G Wolf, who designed His Majesty's Theatre.

List of notable buildings
Castle Hotel
Central Buildings
Courthouse
Convent and convent school
Davies Buildings
Dinsdale's Shoe Emporium
Edwards' Store (former)
Eliza's Cottage
Faversham House
Fire Station (former)
Flour Mill
Holy Trinity Church
Hope Farm
Hospital (Former)
Imperial Hotel
Kairey Cottage
Kings Head Hotel (former)
Marwick's Shed
Masonic Hall (former)
Mongers Store
Motor Museum
Nineteen Mile Inn (former)
Post office
School (Former)
Railway station building
Residency Museum
Sargent's pharmacy
St Patrick's Church
Settlers House
Suspension Bridge
Town Hall
Uniting Church
Western Australian Bank (former)
York Palace Hotel

See also
 List of heritage places in York, Western Australia

List of notable people
Peter Barrow (1813–1899), magistrate and Guardian of Aborigines, priest and school teacher in York in 1840 and 1841. 
Chance Bateman (1981–), former AFL player for the Hawthorn Football Club.
Enid Bennett (1893–1969), silent film actress, born in York.
Marjorie Bennett (1896-1982) was an Australian-born television and film actress born in York, who worked mainly in Great Britain and the United States, who began her acting career during the silent film era, sister of Enid.
Revett Henry Bland (1811–1994), early settler and first resident magistrate in York.
William Locke Brockman (1802–1872), an early settler who became a leading pastoralist and stock breeder, and a Member of the Western Australian Legislative Council.
Eliza Brown (1811–1896), wife of Thomas Brown. She and Thomas wrote letters to her father, William Bussey, many of which were published in the book "A Faithful Picture" by Peter Cowan.
Thomas Brown (1803–1862), early York settler farming at Grass Dale, which he purchased from Revett Henry Bland, became a Member of the Western Australian Legislative Council.
Henry William St Pierre Bunbury (1812–1875), Lieutenant of 21st Regiment, stationed in York in 1836, led attack in Avon Valley against Aboriginal peoples, established military post in Bunbury which was named after him, his letters were published in 1930.
Lockier Burges (1814–1886), emigrated to Western Australia with his two brothers William Burges and Samuel Evans Burges.  They took up 5,600 acres (2,300 ha) of land at York in 1837, which they named Tipperary after their birthplace. 
Thomas Burges (1830–1893) was a pastoralist and politician who was a member of the Legislative Council of Western Australia.
William Burges (1806 or 1808–1876), brother of Lockier. As secretary of the York Agricultural Society in 1847, he was closely involved in that body's ultimately successful petition for Western Australia to become a penal colony.  He strongly opposed female convicts.
Solomon Cook (1812–1871) was an American engineer who constructed a substantial mill and one of Western Australia's first steam engines at York.
James Cowan (1848–1937), York Clerk of Courts and Postmaster (1864–1870) who became registrar and Master of the Supreme Court; husband of Edith Cowan.
Walkinshaw Cowan (1808–1888) was the Protector of Natives at York (from 1848), also a Police Magistrate and then Resident Magistrate of York and Beverley (1863–1887).
William Cowan (1854–1940), York Clerk of Courts (1870–1875), resident magistrate (1897–1919). During the whole term of occupancy on the bench, none of his decisions was upset on appeal, including an appeal to the High Court.
Cowits (c.1832–1868), first Aboriginal Assistant at the York Police Station, who at 10 years of age accompanied Henry Landor and Henry Maxwell Lefroy on their 1842 expedition south east of Beverley, and later accompanied Lefroy's 1863 expedition to what is now called Lake Lefroy.
Les Craig CMG (1892–1966) was a politician who was a member of the Legislative Council of Western Australia.
Samuel Smale Craig (1802–1869), constructed the Castle Hotel in 1853 and then ran it until his death.
Robert Dale (1810–1853), the first European to cross the Darling Range, where he discovered the fertile Avon Valley and explored the future locations of Northam, Toodyay and York.
William Dinsdale Snr (1816–1878), arrived 1858 as a convict, brought family out in 1863, York shoe and boot maker, also a small farmer.
William Dinsdale Jnr (1851–1921) Mayor of York from 3 December 1896 to November 1898, and again from 20 November 1901 to 1907; built Dinsdale's Shoe Emporium; in 1897 became Manager and then co-owner of the York Flour Mill.
Robert Doncon (1814–1881) with his wife Sophia in 1849 built and then ran the Kings Head Inn.
Aimable Duperouzel (1831–1901), French born convict who became a successful farmer and land owner.
John Drummond (1816–1906) was an early settler and the first Inspector of Native Police.
William Edwards (1792–1865), former soldier who had fought at Waterloo, moved to York in the 1840s, his grandsons Charles and Kenneth established in 1882 the store which is now the York and Districts Co-op.
William Edwards Jnr (1821–1889), opened a store in 1867 (where Central Buildings now are), then into a new building on the same site at the end of 1871; built Heartleap Hill.
Zac Fisher (1998–), AFL player for the Carlton Football Club.
Patrick Joseph Gibney (1843–1915), Catholic priest in York from 1868 to 1900, responsible for constructing St Patrick's Catholic Church, York.
Eric William Gillett (1899—1987) was mayor of the Municipality of Claremont from 1940 until 1953, and Chancellor of the University of Western Australia from 1948 until 1956.
Louis Giustiniani was an Italian missionary who came to Western Australia in 1836 with his wife Maria to establish a Moravian style mission employing Aboriginal peoples at Guildford.  He also visited York.  He formed the view that the settlers were always at fault in conflicts with Aboriginal peoples, reporting his findings to Lord Glenelg.  He was attacked for his views and was recalled to London.
David Gault (born 1975) is a former Australian rules footballer who played for the South Fremantle Football Club in the West Australian Football League.
Ron Gaunt (1934-2012) was an Australian cricketer who played in 3 Tests from 1958 to 1964.
Patrick Hackett (c.1857–1884), Police Constable, murdered in Beverley by Thomas Carbury and Andrew Miller.
Edward Hamersley (senior) (1810–1874), early settler and landholder.
Edward Hamersley (junior) (1835–1927), son of Edward Hamersley (senior), inherited Wilberforce. Elected in 1880 to the Legislative Council seat of York. 
John Hardey (1802-1885) was an early settler and farmed near York, brother of Joseph.
Joseph Hardey (1804-1875) was a Wesleyan preacher from Lincolnshire and early settler, farmed at Tranby House Maylands and then at York with his brother John.
Nicholas Hasluck (1942–), retired judge and poet, has a home in York.
Sir Paul Hasluck (1905–1993), politician and Governor-General of Australia, lived in York for a while when young.
Edmund Henderson (1821–1896), Comptroller-General of Convicts in Western Australia from 1850 to 1863 and in about mid 1854 drew a picture of York from Mt Brown, which was turned into an engraving which was published in The Illustrated London News of 28 February 1857.
Sir William Heseltine (1930–), Private Secretary to Sir Robert Menzies, Prime Minister, 1955–1959, and later Private Secretary to the Sovereign, and Keeper of the Queen's Archives, lived at York for a while during retirement.
James William Hope (1851-1918) appointed as Resident Medical Officer for the York District in 1874, married Helena Aurora Monger in 1878, in 1882 became Medical Officer at Fremantle Prison and then superintendent of the Fremantle Lunatic Asylum, later became Commissioner of Health.
William Hoops (1819–1893), farmed with Samuel Burges before becoming a storekeeper and postmaster in York.
Henry Horton (1818–1887), licensee of the "Lakes Inn" from 1859, and ran a passenger service from Guildford to York.
Richard Roach Jewell (1810–1891), architect of a number of York buildings.
Moondyne Joe (c 1826–1900), a convict and Western Australia's best-known bushranger, spent a night in the York lockup in December 1865 during his escape from custody.
Robert Juniper, artist and designer of the stained glass windows of Holy Trinity Church, York.
King Dick, an Aboriginal man who showed Edward Parker and William McKnoe an all weather route from St Ronan's Well to Mahogany Inn in 1849 (called King Dick's line of road).
Billy Kickett (also called Noongale) (1853–1905), aboriginal who (with Tommy Windich) accompanied John Forrest and Alexander Forrest on their expedition across the Great Australian Bight to Adelaide in mid 1870.
Edward Wilson Landor (1816–1878), lawyer, scholar, writer and pioneer, who wrote about Western Australia including visits to Balladong Farm and going to the York Fair in the 1840s, brother of Henry Landor.
Henry Landor (1816–1877), settler, farmer, physician, scientist and explorer who farmed with Nathan Knight on Bland's 4,000 acre farm Balladong from 1841 to 1844, and was active in the community.  He emigrated to Ontario and became the first medical superintendent of the Asylum for the Insane, London, Ontario and an advocate of moral treatment of mental patients.
Henry Maxwell Lefroy (1818–1879) was an early settler in York and a prominent explorer of the Mid West and Goldfields–Esperance regions.
Dominic McCarthy (1892–1975), was an Australian recipient of the Victoria Cross, born in York.
Esmae Marwick (1911–1990), founder of The York Society.
Thomas Marwick (1895–1960) was a politician and the first West Australian to have served in both houses of federal parliament.
Warren Marwick (1896–1955) was a farmer and politician in the Western Australian Legislative Council
William Marwick (1833-1925) was a settler who came from England in 1852 as an 18-year-old boy to York, gradually built up a large carting and fodder business, and amassed large land holdings.  He was closely involved in the opening up of the goldfields in the 1880s and 1890s.
Reg Mattiske (1912–1992), born and raised in York, was a politician and member of the Western Australian Legislative Council from 1956 to 1965, representing Metropolitan Province. 
Richard Goldsmith Meares (1780–1862), second resident magistrate of York and Beverley.
Janet Millett (1821–1904), née Webster, wife of York Anglican priest Rev Edward Millett (1863–1869) and author of An Australian Parsonage (published 1872).
Jimmy Melbourne (c.1876–1937) was the first Indigenous Australian to play senior Australian rules football in a major Australian football league.
Frederick Monger (1863-1919), businessman and politician who was a member of the Legislative Assembly of Western Australia from 1892 to 1903 and again from 1905 to 1914, representing the seat of York. He and his father, John Henry Monger Jr, were the first father–son pair to be elected to the Parliament of Western Australia.
John Henry Monger Snr (1802–1867), early settler, opened first hotel and store in York, became a prominent land owner, built the first two stages of Faversham House. 
John Henry Monger Jr (1831–1892), was a Member of the Western Australian Legislative Council from 1870 to 1875, and again from 1890 to 1892.
Joseph Taylor Monger (1831–1892), was a Member of the Western Australian Legislative Council from 1875 to 1880, and a York merchant.
George Fletcher Moore (1798–1856), early settler and explorer of the Avon River and early land owner.
Joseph Nunan (1854–1917), Fenian convict, architect of architect of St Patrick's Church in York.
Walter Padbury (1820–1907), merchant and philanthropist, worked as a shepherd for the Burges brothers in York from 1836 to 1842.
Stephen Parker (senior) (c.1790–c.1880), early York settler.
Stephen Stanley Parker (1817–1904), son of Stephen Parker (senior)
Stephen Henry Parker (1846–1927), son of Stephen Stanley Parker
Marlion Pickett (born 1892) is a professional Australian rules footballer playing for the Richmond Football Club in the Australian Football League (AFL). He was the first player to debut in a VFL/AFL grand final in 67 years and the first to win a premiership in his debut game since 1926. Has lived in York.
Christopher Pullin (1947–), former judge, has a home in York.
Joseph Pyke (1831–1910) who settled in York in 1857 with his wife Elizabeth, become a store keeper and land owner, and took a prominent and active role in town affairs.
Hugh Roche (1893–1962) was a politician who served as a Country Party member of the Legislative Council of Western Australia from 1940 to 1960.
Herbie Screaigh (1911–2002) was an Australian rules footballer who played for the East Perth Football Club in the Western Australian National Football League (WANFL).
John Smithies (1802–1872), Wesleyan minister who tried to establish the Gerald Mission in York.
John Taylor (1821–1890), son of an Oxford carpenter, arrived 1841 with a horse and cow, indentured to Thomas Brown, leased and then purchased Yangedine, built a farming estate.
Lindsay Thorn (1891–1971) was a Country Party member of the Legislative Assembly of Western Australia from 1930 to 1959, representing the seat of Toodyay and a minister in the government of Sir Ross McLarty.
Arthur Trimmer (1805-1877) was one of the first settlers in York, being with Revett Henry Bland the first to breed merino sheep (later Balladong Farm).  Bland and Trimmer built the first building in the town, which was sold to John Henry Monger Snr in 1836, and he later moved to the Albany region.
Arthur Wansbrough (1877–1949) was a trade unionist and politician who was a Labor Party member of the Legislative Assembly of Western Australia from 1924 to 1936, representing the seat of Albany.
Tommy Windich (c1840-c1876), indigenous member of a number of exploring expeditions in Western Australia in the 1860s and 1870s.  Worked at York.
Frank Wittenoom (1855–1939) was an explorer and pastoralist.
John Burdett Wittenoom (1788–1855), early settler and land owner.
Garnet Wood (1888–1952), Country Party member of the Legislative Council of Western Australia and a minister in the government of Ross McLarty, who farmed at York.

Facilities

The York Visitor Centre is located in the Town Hall.

York is well serviced with all essential facilities, including York District High School for students from kindergarten to Year 10. The York Community Resource Centre enables access to tertiary education. There is a 24/7 medical service, the York District Hospital, library, and swimming pool.

York has had a community radio station, Voice of the Avon 101.3FM, since 1994. Beginning life as York FM in the old convent the current location is at the corner of Barker St and Forrest St. The volunteer-driven station presents a 24/7 music service with presenters providing their own programs for 82 hours per week between 6am and 10pm.

Climate
York is in a temperate climate zone and experiences distinctly dry (and hot) summers and cool, wet winters. Under the Köppen climate classification, York has a Mediterranean climate. York has hotter summer afternoons than Perth, with a huge difference compared to the Fremantle shoreline. Winters are more likely to see cold nights instead due to the lower maritime influence. Air frost during the night can emerge on certain occasions during the colder months.

Climate data has been recorded by the Bureau of Meteorology at York Post Office from 1877 to 1996, and another site from 1996 onwards.

Mean temperatures are based on data from 1880 to 1996.

A severe thunderstorm lashed the town and surrounding areas on 27 January 2011, resulting in roofs being ripped off, trees being uprooted and power lines being brought down.
About 40 houses were damaged in the town as a result of the storm but no injuries were reported.

Notes

References

External links

Shire of York

 
Towns in Western Australia
Grain receival points of Western Australia
1831 establishments in Australia